CIMS Hospital (Care Institute of Medical Sciences) is a 300-bed super specialty hospital located on the Science City Road, Sola, Ahmedabad (Gujarat, India).

History 
CIMS Hospital was established in 2010  by a group of leading cardiologists and cardiac surgeons to provide super-speciality healthcare in the region.

CIMS 
The hospital scores high on technological excellence. State-of-the-art Cardiac-Cathlab (fastest in the world with automatic "7 second" angiography) intensive care units, sleep lab, high-frequency ventilator for neonates, 8 OTs with 4 fully modular with LED lights (energy & carbon savings), modular operation theaters with class 100 laminar air flow- only place in Gujarat to offer such combination. The hospital strengthens advanced healthcare services available in the region which was under served by existing hospitals and caters to needs of the rapidly growing city of Ahmedabad and Gujarat region. It is also seen as a booster for quality medical tourism to the region. It is the first hospital in Gujarat to have completed a heart transplant under the leadership of Dr. Dhiren Shah. The hospital ranks as one of the best choice hospitals in Ahmedabad as per The Times Group ratings for the All India critical care hospital ranking survey 2016 in areas such as cardiac, gastroenterology, neuro sciences, renal sciences, oncology, pediatrics amongst many others.

The hospital provides diagnostic medical, surgical, palliative care facilities. and is Ahmedabad's first Green Hospital. The hospital is accredited to Joint Commission International (JCI), National Accreditation Board for Hospitals & Healthcare Providers and National Accreditation Board for Testing and Calibration Laboratories.

CIMS Foundation provides financial aid and affordable healthcare to needy patients.

On 19 December 2016 CIMS Heart Transplant Team conducted the first heart transplant surgery of Gujarat at CIMS Hospital.

TAVR 
On 10 April 2017, CIMS Hospital Created Medical History in Gujarat by using the New Revolutionary Technology TAVR (Transcatheter Aortic Valve Implantation or Replacement) - A Total Non-Surgical Aortic Valve Replacement.

References

Further reading 
Shah B, Kaushik S. Innovative use of social media platform WhatsApp during influenza outbreak in Gujarat, India. WHO South-East Asia J Public Health 201 5; 4(2): 213–214.

External links 
 

Hospitals in Ahmedabad
Hospitals established in 2010
2010 establishments in Gujarat